Pak Myong-won (born 1 January 1986) is a North Korean sport shooter.

He participated at the 2018 ISSF World Shooting Championships, winning a medal.

References

External links

Living people
1986 births
North Korean male sport shooters
Running target shooters
Shooters at the 2010 Asian Games
Shooters at the 2014 Asian Games
Shooters at the 2018 Asian Games
Medalists at the 2010 Asian Games
Medalists at the 2014 Asian Games
Medalists at the 2018 Asian Games
Asian Games gold medalists for North Korea
Asian Games silver medalists for North Korea
Asian Games medalists in shooting
21st-century North Korean people